Los Fernández de Peralvillo is a 1954 Mexican film directed by Alejandro Galindo. The film is based in the play of Juan H. Durán and Casahonda. It stars Sara García, Victor Parra, and David Silva.

Synopsis 
Mario is a fatherless and lives in Peralvillo with his two sisters and his mother. As he has no studies, he is related to some thugs, with whom he becomes rich and powerful. However, Mario ends up despising his people, and little by little, loneliness takes over him. One night, intending to make amends, he takes a walk around Peralvillo, his old neighborhood, but fate prepares to collect his debts, and there he meets a guy he despised long ago, who ends his life.

Prizes and Awards 
Los Fernández de Peralvillo received six Ariel Awards, included Best Movie and Best Director. The movie also received nine nominations.

References

External links 
 

1954 films
1950s Spanish-language films
Mexican black-and-white films
Mexican crime films
1954 crime films
1950s Mexican films